The 1996 season was the Washington Redskins' 65th in the National Football League, and their 61st since the franchise moved to Washington, D.C. It was their last season playing at RFK Stadium, where they had played since 1961. They began the season aiming to improve on their 6–10 record from the year before, but after winning seven of their first eight games, they managed just two victories in the second half of the season and finished with a 9–7 record. By virtue of their inferior intra-conference record (6–6) compared to the Minnesota Vikings (8–4), the Redskins became the first team in NFL history to start the season 7–1 and not make the playoffs (this was later matched by the 2012 Chicago Bears).

Although the Redskins' offense was eighth in the league in scoring, their defense surrendered 2,275 rushing yards, the most in the NFL that year. Statistics site Football Outsiders calculated that the 1996 Redskins had, play-for-play, the worst run defense they had ever tracked. At the end of the season, in a 37-10 victory over the Dallas Cowboys, past and present Redskins greats were honored at halftime and were introduced and taken around in golf carts in a final "victory lap" around the stadium to acknowledge the fans one last time.

Offseason

NFL Draft

Personnel

Staff

Roster

Regular season

Schedule

Standings

Awards and records
 Darrell Green, Walter Payton Man of the Year Award

References

Washington
Washington Redskins seasons
Red